Doron Ben-Ami (born 1965) is an Israeli archaeologist.

Ben-Ami earned his PhD at the Hebrew University of Jerusalem in 2003 where he was a member of the Institute of Archaeology as of 2009. He is the discoverer of the structure thought to be the palace of Queen Helena of Adiabene in the City of David, Jerusalem.

Since 2007, he has led the excavation in the Givati Parking Lot in the City of David - the largest, most comprehensive excavation in Jerusalem today, which has revealed important findings that contribute to understanding the history of the city.

See also

 Acra (fortress)
 Givati Parking Lot dig

References

External links 

 
 As of February 2018 the US Library of Congress identifies the archaeologist born 1965 (LCCN, below) but its online catalogue conflates 2 records of his works with those of 16 works by the illustrator born 1955 (visit and select "Browse ... LC Online Catalog").

Israeli archaeologists
Living people
1965 births